Shenzhen Tianxingyun Supply Chain Co., Ltd., better known as Xingyun, is a Chinese e-commerce company which provides services for commodities internationally. It is based in Shenzhen, China. In 2021, Xingyun became a unicorn company after the funding round.

It helps expand international companies in China.

History 
Xingyun has received funding in multiple rounds such as $200 million in series c funding in September 2020 and $600 million in series C2 funding in April 2021.

In August 2021, it expanded its operations to Kenya.

Recognition 
In 2021, it was included in China Daily's unicorn companies list.

References 

Companies based in Shenzhen